WYR may refer to:

 West Yorkshire Railway
 West Yorkshire Regiment, an infantry unit of the British Army, active 1685–1958
 WYR series, a wireless router from Buffalo Technology